

Events
1751 is the year commonly given as the beginning of the classical era
The "War of the Buffoons" (La Querelle des Bouffons), concerning the relative merits of French and Italian opera, divides Paris.
Francesco Geminiani publishes "The Art of Playing on the Violin" in London.

Classical music
Charles Avison – 6 Concertos in 7 Parts, Op. 3
Johann Sebastian Bach – Kunst der Fuge with appendix of Chorale prelude BWV 668a (posthumously)
Charles Burney – 6 Cornet Pieces for Organ
Armand-Louis Couperin – , in his Pieces de Clavesin
Antoine Dauvergne – Concerts de Simphonies
Pierre-Claude Foucquet – Second Livre de Pièces de Clavecin
Johann Adolphe Hasse 
Mass in D minor
Oh Dio partir conviene
Wilhelm Gommaar Kennis – 6 Trio Sonatas, Op. 2
Niccolò Pasquali – Raccolta di overture, e symphonie... (London)
Peter Pasqualino – 6 Cello Duets, Op. 2 (London: John Johnson)
John Francis Wade – Cantus Diversi including Adeste Fideles ("O Come All Ye Faithful")

Opera
Pasquale Cafaro – Ipermestra
Baldassare Galuppi – Antigona
Carl Heinrich Graun 
Britannico, GraunWV B:I:24
L'Armida GraunWV B:I:23, premiered Mar. 27 in Berlin
Johann Adolf Hasse – Ciro Riconosciuto
Joseph Haydn – Der Krumme Teufel (singspiel)
Niccolò Jommelli – La villana nobile; Ifigenia in Aulide
Jean-Philippe Rameau 
Acante et Céphise
La Guirlande, RCT 42
Giuseppe Sarti – Pompeo in Armenia
Domingo Terradellas – Sesostri re d'Egitto

Methods and theory writings 

 William Hayes – The Art of Composing Music by a Method Entirely New
 Jacob Wilhelm Lustig – Inleiding tot de Muzykkunde
 Manuel de Moraes Pedroso – Compendio musico

Births
 January 18 – Ferdinand Kauer, pianist and composer (died 1831)
 February 9 – Antoine Bullant, bassoonist and composer (died 1821)
 March 5 – Jan Křtitel Kuchař, composer
 March 29 – Supply Belcher, singer, composer and compiler of tune books (died 1836)

 July 30 – Maria Anna Mozart ("Nannerl"), Austrian musician and composer, sister of Wolfgang Amadeus Mozart (d. 1829)

 date unknown – Blas de Laserna, composer

Deaths
 January 17 – Tomaso Albinoni (born 1671)
 February 18 – Giuseppe Matteo Alberti, composer (born 1685)
 May 20 – Domènec Terradellas, composer (born 1713)
 October 2 – Pierre Dumage, organist (born c. 1674)
date unknown – Henry Reinhold, singer (born c. 1690)

 
18th century in music
Music by year